Heimdal or Jønsrud is a village in Løten Municipality in Innlandet county, Norway.

Since 2012, the population and area data for this village area has not been separately tracked by Statistics Norway.

References

Løten
Villages in Innlandet